The 1999 season of 2. deild karla was the 34th season of third-tier football in Iceland.

Standings

Top scorers

References
 

2. deild karla seasons
Iceland
Iceland
3